Marie-Lambertine Coclers (1761 – after 1815) was a Southern Netherlandish pastel artist and engraver.

Born in Liège, Coclers was the daughter of Jean-Baptiste Coclers, who died during her childhood. Her instructor was her elder brother, Jean-Baptiste-Bernard Coclers; he made an etching of a young female artist at work which might depict his sister. She came from a family with many artists. She worked in Amsterdam for a while and there she adapted the style of  Adriaen van Ostade.

Gallery

References

1761 births
Year of death unknown
Belgian women painters
Belgian engravers
Women engravers
18th-century engravers
19th-century Belgian painters
19th-century engravers
18th-century women artists
19th-century Belgian women artists
Pastel artists
18th-century painters from the Prince-Bishopric of Liège